Voices is a 1985 four-minute 16 mm short animated film directed produced and animated by Joanna Priestley with sound design and production by R. Dennis Wiancko. It was made with ink, watercolor, and pastel drawings/paintings on paper (index cards).

Synopsis
Voices is an exploration of fear of the dark, old age, obesity, monsters, and global destruction. According to Northwest Film and Video Festival juror Marv Newland, "Priestley gets across a series of personal phobias in a refreshing and humorous fashion. We get a superb, contemporary animated film with salutes to historical cartoon figures scattered throughout." Ed Emshwiller described the film as "showing great joy and delight in being alive" and a "message with style".

Production
Priestley began work on Voices in Portland, Oregon, in spring 1983, after completing The Rubber Stamp Film. She wrote the script, rehearsed it and hired cinematographer Jan Baross to shoot the live-action 16 mm footage that was used for rotoscoping. In September 1983, Priestley moved to Valencia, California, to attend California Institute of the Arts (CalArts), where she was the teaching assistant to Jules Engel, head of the Experimental Animation Department. Voices became one of three films, along with Jade Leaf (the first computer film made at CalArts) and The Dancing Bulrushes (co-directed by Steven Subotnick), that were presented at Priestley's thesis review. She received an MFA in Experimental Animation and the Louis B. Mayer Award.

Priestley used pencil, India ink, felt pens, watercolors, and gouache on index cards to animate Voices. The movie was made over a three-year period. The index cards were shot on 16 mm film (Kodak ECO stock) with an old Bolex camera that was purchased at a flea market. Priestley used a simple, homemade animation stand that was a gift from Portland filmmaker Jim Blashfield.

Soundtrack
R. Dennis Wiancko created the soundtrack for Voices by using music clips and homemade sound effects. For the squeaky sounds when the cat rubs its tail came from manipulating a rubber suction device in a snakebite kit. Wiancko collected source material with a Tascam stereo cassette recorder and layered the sound master together on a quarter-inch open reel recorder.

Release
Voices was released in 1985 and premiered at the Telluride Film Festival in Colorado. The film was re-released on DVD in 2006 by Microcinema International. Voices was screened in many retrospectives of Priestley's works, including at REDCAT in Los Angeles in April 2009, Stuttgart International Animation Festival and British Film Institute (BFI) National Film Theatre in May 2017, Sweaty Eyeballs Animation Festival in Baltimore, Maryland, on October 18, 2019, and Fantoche International Animation Festival (Baden, Switzerland) on September 3, 2019.

Awards
National Independent Film Competition: First Place (US)
National Educational Film Festival: First Place (US)
Odense International Film Festival: Special Jury Prize (Denmark)
Algarve Cinema Festival: Best Animated Film (Portugal)
Tel Aviv International Film Festival: First Place (US)
Big Muddy Film Festival: Best of Festival (US)
Canadian International Animation Festival: Special Merit Award (US)
Northwest Film and Video Festival: Best of Festival (US)
CINE Competition: Gold Eagle Award (US)
Chicago International Film Festival: Bronze Hugo Award (US)
USA Film Festival: Finalist (US)
Sinking Creek Film Festival: Cash Award Winner (US)

Film festivals

Telluride Film Festival (Colorado, US) 
Hiroshima International Animation Festival (Japan) 
Zagreb International Animation Festival (Croatia) 
Hong Kong International Film Festival (China) 
Los Angeles International Animation Celebration (US)
Denver International Film Festival (US) 
Olympia Film Festival (US) 
Black Maria Film Festival (US) 
Stuttgart International Animation Festival (Germany)
Films des Femmes: Festival International de Créteil (France) 
San Francisco International Film Festival (US)
Montreal International Women's Film Festival (Canada)
New York Filmmaker's Expo (US) 
Bumbershoot Film Festival (US) 
Flaherty Film Seminar (US) 
Womanimation! Film Festival (US)
Big Cartoon Festival (Moscow, Russia)

Touring programs

The Festival of Animation (US)
Black Maria Film Festival Tour (US)
Northwest Film Festival Tour (US)

References

External links
 Voices at the Internet Movie Database

1983 films
1983 animated films
1980s American animated films
1980s animated short films
American animated short films
Films directed by Joanna Priestley
1980s English-language films